Biosaline agriculture is the production and growth of plants in saline rich groundwater and/or soil. In water scarce locations, salinity poses a serious threat to agriculture due to its toxicity to most plants. Abiotic stressors such as salinity, extreme temperatures, and drought make plant growth difficult in many climate regions. Integration of biosaline solutions is becoming necessary in arid and semiarid climates where freshwater abundance is low and seawater is ample. Salt-tolerant plants that flourish in high-salinity conditions are called halophytes. Halophyte implementation has the potential to restore salt-rich environments, provide for global food demands, produce medicine and biofuels, and conserve fresh water.

Uses 

 Crops: Various halophytes, such as Mesembryanthemum crystallinum, and Salsola soda, are vegetables that can be grown for human consumption. Other halophytes, such as Bassia hyssopifolia and Panicum turgidum can be used as forage or fodder to feed livestock, performing as efficiently as commonly used feed.
 Desalination/Restoration: Biosaline agriculture can be a sustainable solution to traditional agricultural because it allows ecosystem restoration. Halophytes have properties that can desalinate, capture heavy metals in soil, and don't require fresh water to produce. By planting multiple cycles of halophytes, the ground can be restored to a healthier state for traditional agriculture use. Ecosystem restoration can occur through transfer of halophyte to salt sensitive plants. This increases the salt tolerance of glycophytes, salt sensitive species that make up the majority of agriculture crops.
 Medicines: Biosaline agriculture can be used to grow plants with anti-inflammatory, antioxidant, and anticancer properties. Examples of these species include the Arthrocnemum indicum and Limoniastrum monopetalum. Additionally, various halophytes such as the Heliotropium curassavicum, can promote wound healing.
 Biofuel: Research is ongoing about the benefits of halophyte use in biofuel production. Some species produce nearly 40% oil per seed and species like the Karelinia caspia, can produce high amounts of methane.

See also

References 

Agriculture
Halophytes
Earth sciences